Scerri is a surname. Notable people with the surname include:

Charles Scerri (born 1964), Maltese footballer
Debbie Scerri (born 1969), Maltese television presenter and singer
Eric Scerri, American chemist, writer and philosopher
Madeleine Scerri (born 1989), Maltese swimmer
Mark Scerri (born 1990), Maltese footballer
Pierre Scerri, French engineer
Terence Scerri (born 1984), Maltese footballer

Maltese-language surnames